Kindle Worlds was a publisher service of the online retailer Amazon, devoted to providing a commercial venue for fan fiction creations of specific licensed media properties. It was established on May 22, 2013, as part of Amazon Publishing. In August 2018, Amazon shut down the Kindle Worlds website.

The purpose of this service was to publish fan fiction stories of certain licensed media properties to be sold in the Kindle Store with terms including 35% of net sales for works of 10,000 words or more and 20% for short fiction ranging from 5000 to 10,000 words.

Stories hosted on the service were required to abide by some restrictions, including a ban on pornographic or offensive content and copyright violations. The stories must be correctly formatted and were prohibited from using misleading titles.

Licensed properties
 The Arrangement
 The Abnorm Chronicles
 Body Movers
 The Dead Man
 The Foreworld Saga
 G.I. Joe
 Gossip Girl
 The Lizzy Gardner Files
 Veronica Mars
 Pretty Little Liars
 John Rain
 Ravenswood
 Silo Saga
 Valiant Comics
 The Vampire Diaries
 Wayward Pines
 The World of Kurt Vonnegut
 X-O Manowar

Reference List

External links
 Kindle Worlds Store
 Official website for Kindle Worlds authors

Amazon (company)
Fan fiction
Digital press
Publishing companies of the United States
Self-publishing companies